|}

The Mares' Novices' Hurdle Series Final is a Grade 2 National Hunt hurdle race in Great Britain which is open to mares and fillies aged four years or older. It is run at Newbury over a distance of about 2 miles and 4½ furlongs (2 miles, 4 furlongs and 118 yards, or 4,141 metres) and during its running there are 10 flights of hurdles to be jumped. The race is for novice hurdlers, and it is scheduled to take place each year in March. The race is a Limited Handicap and was awarded Grade 2 status in 2017.

Winners

See also
 Horse racing in Great Britain
 List of British National Hunt races

References

Racing Post: 

National Hunt races in Great Britain
Newbury Racecourse
National Hunt hurdle races